The pourtalesiids (Pourtalesiidae) are a family of irregular sea urchins that live in the deep sea. They are secondarily bilateral-symmetrical and like other representatives of the taxon Holasteroida they lack the lantern of Aristotle, which is typical for many other sea urchins. The genus Pourtalesia was named after Louis-François de Pourtalès who first collected these animals while dredging at a depth of 600 m. The family is known already from the Upper Cretaceous (Maastrichtian) and is distributed worldwide.

Species and Genera 
Currently, there are 10 genera with 28 extant and 5 extinct species described.

 genus Ceratophysa Pomel, 1883
 Ceratophysa ceratopyga (A. Agassiz, 1879)
 Ceratophysa rosea (A. Agassiz, 1879)
 genus Cystocrepis Mortensen, 1907
Cystocrepis setigera (A. Agassiz, 1898)
 genus Echinocrepis A. Agassiz, 1879
Echinocrepis cuneata A. Agassiz, 1879 
 Echinocrepis rostrata Mironov, 1973 
 genus Echinosigra Mortensen, 1907
Echinosigra (Echinogutta) amphora Mironov, 1974 
 Echinosigra (Echinogutta) antarctica Mironov, 1974 
 Echinosigra (Echinogutta) fabrefacta Mironov, 1974 
 Echinosigra (Echinogutta) valvaedentata Mironov, 1974 
 Echinosigra (Echinosigra) mortensi Mironov, 1974 
 Echinosigra (Echinosigra) phiale (Thomson, 1873) 
 Echinosigra (Echinosigra) porrecta  Mironov, 1974 
 Echinosigra (Echinosigra) vityazi  Mironov, 1997 
 genus Galeaster Seunes, 1889 †
Galeaster carinatus Ravn, 1927 †
 Galeaster dagestanensis Poslavskaya & Moskvin, 1960  †
 Galeaster minor Poslavskaya, in Moskvin & Poslavskaya, 1949 † 
 Galeaster muntshiensis Tzaghareli, 1949  †
 Galeaster sumbaricus Poslavskaya, in Moskvin & Poslavskaya, 1949 † 
 genus Helgocystis Mortensen, 1907
Helgocystis carinata (A. Agassiz, 1879)
 genus Pourtalesia A. Agassiz, 1869
Pourtalesia alcocki Koehler, 1914
 Pourtalesia aurorae Koehler, 1926
 Pourtalesia debilis Koehler, 1926
 Pourtalesia heptneri Mironov, 1978
 Pourtalesia hispida A. Agassiz, 1897
 Pourtalesia jeffreysi Thomson, 1873
 Pourtalesia laguncula A. Agassiz, 1879
 Pourtalesia miranda A. Agassiz, 1869
 Pourtalesia tanneri A. Agassiz, 1898
 Pourtalesia thomsoni Mironov, 1976
 Pourtalesia vinogradovae Mironov, 1995
 genus Rictocystis Mironov, 1996
Rictocystis jensenae Mironov, 1996
 genus Solenocystis Mironov, 2008
Solenocystis imitans Mironov, 2008
 genus Spatagocystis A. Agassiz, 1879
Spatagocystis challengeri  A. Agassiz, 1879

Sources 

Holasteroida
Echinoderm families
Taxa named by Alexander Agassiz